The 2018–19 Borussia Dortmund season was the 110th season in the football club's history and 43rd consecutive and 52nd overall season in the top flight of German football, the Bundesliga, having been promoted from the 2. Bundesliga Nord in 1976.

In addition to the domestic league, Borussia Dortmund also participated in the season's editions of the domestic cup, the DFB-Pokal, and the first-tier continental cup, the UEFA Champions League. This was the 45th season for Dortmund in the Signal Iduna Park, located in Dortmund, North Rhine-Westphalia, Germany. The season covered a period from 1 July 2018 to 30 June 2019.

The season was the first since 2001–02 without Roman Weidenfeller, who retired after the 2017–18 season.

Players

Squad information

Transfers

Transfers in

Loans in

Transfers out

Loans out

Kits

Friendly matches

Competitions

Overview

Bundesliga

League table

Results summary

Results by round

Matches

DFB-Pokal

UEFA Champions League

Group stage

Knockout phase

Round of 16

Statistics

Appearances and goals

|-
! colspan=16 style=background:#dcdcdc; text-align:center| Goalkeepers

|-
! colspan=16 style=background:#dcdcdc; text-align:center| Defenders

|-
! colspan=16 style=background:#dcdcdc; text-align:center| Midfielders

|-
! colspan=16 style=background:#dcdcdc; text-align:center| Forwards

|-
! colspan=16 style=background:#dcdcdc; text-align:center| Players transferred out during the season

Notes

Goalscorers

Last updated: 18 May 2019

References

Borussia Dortmund seasons
Dortmund
Borussia Dortmund